Yahaya Musa (born December 20, 1986) is an Australian-American soccer player who most recently played for Wilmington Hammerheads in USL Professional Division.

Career
Musa played college soccer at Stony Brook University. He was captain of Stony Brook in 2006 and 2007 and was a member of the 2005 America East Championship team. In addition, he was 1st team All America East in 2007 and 2006, second team All America East in 2005, and America East Rookie team in 2004.

As well as appearing in the USL Premier Development League for Fort Wayne Fever, Long Island Rough Riders and Kalamazoo Outrage, Musa also spent two seasons in Puerto Rico with Academia Quintana, Sevilla FC Puerto Rico and Bayamón FC.

Musa signed with USL Professional Division club Wilmington Hammerheads in March 2012. He made his debut with the club on April 29, 2012 as a 65th-minute substitute in a 1-0 victory over Pittsburgh Riverhounds.  Musa spent the 2013 season playing for Greek American AA in the Cosmopolitan Soccer League and coaching the Amateur club North Shore Soccer Club in New York, before resigned with the Hammerheads for the 2014 season.

References

External links
 SBUS profile

1986 births
People from Canberra
Living people
American soccer players
Wilmington Hammerheads FC players
Fort Wayne Fever players
Long Island Rough Riders players
Kalamazoo Outrage players
Greek American AA players
USL League Two players
USL Championship players
Australian soccer players
Australian expatriate soccer players
Stony Brook University alumni
Australian expatriate sportspeople in the United States
Academia Quintana players
Association football defenders
Stony Brook Seawolves men's soccer players